James Goldman (born May 17, 1948), known professionally as Jim Gardner, is an American retired news anchor.

Early life and education 
Gardner was born in New York City and grew up on the Upper East Side in a Reform Jewish household. His father was Joseph Goldman, a professor and chairman of the ear, nose and throat department of Mount Sinai Medical Center. Through his father, he is the step-grandson of noted Jewish rabbi Mordecai Kaplan. He attended Ethical Culture Fieldston School. In 1970, he received his Bachelor of Arts degree in political science from Columbia University. As a student, he was a play-by-play announcer for football and basketball, and reported on the Columbia University protests of 1968 for the university's radio station, WKCR-FM.

Career 
In 1970, Gardner became a desk assistant, writer, and producer for 1010 WINS in New York City. In 1972, Gardner became a reporter for WFAS radio in White Plains, New York, and soon became news director. While not finding work in television, he considered re-enrolling for a graduate program at Brown University. Two years later, he began his television broadcast career at WKBW-TV in Buffalo, New York. He took the stage name Gardner because of antisemitism in the Buffalo community, and the thought that there were too many Jewish names on staff.

Gardner worked for WPVI in Philadelphia from June 1, 1976 to December 21, 2022. He started as a reporter and noon anchor, before anchoring the 5:30 PM news by November 1976. He had solo anchored the 6:00 PM weekday newscasts since May 11, 1977, replacing Larry Kane; he also solo anchored the 11:00 PM weekday newscast between May 11, 1977 and January 11, 2022. He covered every Democratic and Republican presidential convention from 1980 on, and has interviewed every president and major presidential candidate from 1976 on. Gardner has also traveled to the scene of breaking news across the world. 

On November 10, 2021, Gardner announced his intentions to retire from broadcasting at the end of 2022. Prior to his retirement, Gardner left his position as anchorman on Action News at 11:00 PM on January 11, 2022, and remained on the 6:00 PM broadcast until his retirement and final broadcast at 6:00 PM on December 21, 2022. Gardner is the second-longest serving news anchor in United States television history, after Dave Ward at Houston sister station KTRK-TV who retired in 2017 after 49 years of anchoring the evening news.

Awards and honors 
Since 1987, Temple University awards The Jim Gardner Journalism Prize. Gardner funds a scholarship at Temple for one student at the school's college of media and communication.

The City of Philadelphia honored Jim Gardner on June 22, 2017 "for his hard work and dedication in the City of Philadelphia over the past 41 years."

Jim Gardner Way, the 4100 block of Monument Road outside the WPVI studios, was dedicated in 2022 in his honor. Additionally the studio from which all Action News broadcasts emanate from is now officially known as the Jim Gardner Studio.

 1996 - Broadcast Pioneers of Philadelphia Person of the Year
 2003 - Broadcast Pioneers of Philadelphia Hall of Fame
 2022 - John Cardinal Foley Award for Excellence in Communication
2022 - The Walt Disney Company honored Gardner with their Mousecar award for his long service to that company, which owns WPVI-TV.

Personal 
Gardner is married to former WPVI-TV sales executive Amy Goldman, who serves as chair of the Radnor Township School District board, and has two children with her, and two other children from a previous marriage. They live in Villanova.

Filmography

Film

Television

References

External links

Profile at 6abc.com
Broadcast Pioneers of Philadelphia website

1948 births
Living people
American television journalists
Television anchors from Philadelphia
Philadelphia television reporters
American male journalists
Journalists from Pennsylvania
Columbia College (New York) alumni
Ethical Culture Fieldston School alumni
People from the Upper East Side